Sotanostenochrus is a genus of hubbardiid short-tailed whipscorpions, first described by Reddell & Cokendolpher in 1991.

Species 
, the World Schizomida Catalog accepts the following two species:

 Sotanostenochrus cookei (Rowland, 1971) – Mexico
 Sotanostenochrus mitchelli (Rowland, 1971) – Mexico

References 

Schizomida genera